Battin is a surname. Notable people with the surname include:

Charles Battin, Luxembourgish brewer, founder of the Brasserie Battin
Skip Battin, American musician
Joe Battin, American baseball player
Jim Battin, American politician
James F. Battin, American politician
Brad Battin, Australian politician
Richard Battin, American applied mathematician
Wendy Battin, American poet